The Kianggeh is a small tributary of the Brunei that flows through Bandar Seri Begawan, the capital of Brunei.
Rivers of Brunei